Birth trauma refers to damage of the tissues and organs of a newly delivered child, often as a result of physical pressure or trauma during childbirth. The term also encompasses the long term consequences, often of cognitive nature, of damage to the brain or cranium. Medical study of birth trauma dates to the 16th century, and the morphological consequences of mishandled delivery are described in Renaissance-era medical literature. Birth injury occupies a unique area of concern and study in the medical canon. In ICD-10 "birth trauma" occupied 49 individual codes (P10-Р15).

However, there are often clear distinctions to be made between brain damage caused by birth trauma and that induced by intrauterine asphyxia. It is also crucial to distinguish between "birth trauma" and "birth injury". Birth injuries encompass any systemic damages incurred during delivery (hypoxic, toxic, biochemical, infection factors, etc.), but "birth trauma" focuses largely on mechanical damage. Caput succedaneum, bruises, bleeding along the displacements of cranial bones, and subcapsular hematomas of the liver are among reported birth injuries. Birth trauma, on the other hand, encompasses the enduring side effects of physical birth injuries, including the ensuing compensatory and adaptive mechanisms and the development of pathological processes (pathogenesis) after the damage.

Signs and symptoms
Complications from birth trauma can include damage to the head, spinal cord, soft tissues, and organs.

Trauma to the head of the infant can manifest as Caput Succedaneum, skull fractures, extracranial and intracranial hemorrhages, and cranial nerve injuries. Caput Succeedaneum is seen as edema in the scalp due to squeezing of the veins from increase pressure while passing through the birth canal.

Birth trauma is uncommon in the Western world in relation to rates in the third world. In the West injury occurs in 1.1% of C-sections.

Causes
 Cephalo-pelvic disproportion,
 the quick and rapid delivery,
 delayed and prolonged delivery,
 the abnormal birth position,
 Asynclitic birth (asinclitismus),
 abnormal fetal attitude (extensor inserting head),
 obstetric turn,
 acceleration and stimulation of the birth,
 breech presentation,
 forceps and vacuum extraction.

While any number of injuries may occur during the birthing process, a number of specific conditions are well described.  Brachial plexus palsy occurs in 0.4 to 5.1 infants per 1000 live birth. Head trauma and brain damage during delivery can lead to a number of conditions include: caput succedaneum, cephalohematoma, subgaleal hemorrhage,  subdural hemorrhage, subarachnoid hemorrhage, epidural hemorrhage, and intraventricular hemorrhage.

The most common fracture during delivery is that of the clavicle (0.5%).

Epidemiology

References

External links 

Childbirth
Birth trauma